Feline infectious peritonitis (FIP) is the name given to a common and aberrant immune response to infection with feline coronavirus (FCoV).

The virus and pathogenesis of FIP 
FCoV is a virus of the gastrointestinal tract. Most infections are either asymptomatic or cause diarrhea, especially in kittens, as maternally derived antibody wanes at between 5 and 7 weeks of age. The virus is a mutation of feline enteric coronavirus (FECV). From the gut, the virus very briefly undergoes a systemic phase, before returning to the gut where it is shed in the feces.

The pathogenesis of FIP is complex. There is a general consensus that FIPVs arise from mutations enabling them to enter or replicate more successfully in monocytes (a type of white blood cell). However, many aspects of virus–host interactions affecting the disease remain uncertain, such as the factors that influence disease form (wet or dry), outcome (death or resistance), and host susceptibility.

Virus transmission 
There is a lack of evidence FIP (Feline infectious peritonitis) is transmissible from cat to cat although it may explain rare mini-outbreaks of FIP. A study on 59 FIP infected cats found that, unlike FCoV, feces from FIP infected cats were not infectious to laboratory cats via oronasal route. FCoV is common in places where large groups of cats are housed together indoors (such as breeding catteries, animal shelters, etc.). The virus is shed in feces, and cats become infected by ingesting or inhaling the virus, usually by sharing cat litter trays, or by the use of contaminated litter scoops or brushes transmitting infected microscopic cat litter particles to uninfected kittens and cats. FCoV can also be transmitted through different bodily fluids. The virus is easily spread through direct contact between cats. The most common form of spreading is through saliva, as most multiple cat homes share food and water dishes. Another major form of spreading is grooming or fighting. When an infected cat grooms a healthy cat, they leave their contaminated saliva on the fur. Later, when the healthy cat goes to groom themselves, they ingest the contaminated saliva and then become infected.

Clinical signs

There are two main forms of FIP: effusive (wet) and non-effusive (dry). While both types are fatal, the effusive form is more common (60–70% of all cases) and progresses more rapidly than the non-effusive form.

Effusive (wet) FIP
The hallmark clinical sign of effusive FIP is the accumulation of fluid within the abdomen or chest, which can cause breathing difficulties. Other symptoms include lack of appetite, fever, weight loss, jaundice, and diarrhea.

Non-effusive (dry) FIP
Dry FIP will also present with lack of appetite, fever, jaundice, diarrhea, and weight loss, but there will not be an accumulation of fluid. Typically a cat with dry FIP will show ocular or neurological signs. For example, the cat may develop difficulty in standing up or walking, becoming functionally paralyzed over time. Loss of vision is another possible outcome of the disease.

Diagnosis

Diagnosing effusive FIP

Diagnosis of the effusive form of the disease has become more straightforward in recent years. Detection of viral RNA in a sample of the effusion (liquid drained from body), such as by reverse transcription polymerase chain reaction (RT-PCR) is diagnostic of effusive FIP. However, that does require that a sample be sent to an external veterinary laboratory. Within the veterinary hospital there are a number of tests which can rule out a diagnosis of effusive FIP within minutes:
 Measure the total protein in the effusion: if it is less than 35g/L, FIP is extremely unlikely.
 Measure the albumin to globulin ratio in the effusion: if it is over 0.8, FIP is ruled out; if it is less than 0.4, FIP is a possible—but not certain—diagnosis.
 Examine the cells in the effusion: if they are predominantly lymphocytes (a type of white blood cell), then FIP is excluded as a diagnosis.

Diagnosing non-effusive FIP
Non-effusive FIP is more difficult to diagnose than effusive FIP because the clinical signs tend to be more vague and varied: the list of differential diagnoses is therefore much longer. Non-effusive FIP diagnosis should be considered when the following criteria are met:

 History: the cat is young (under 2 years old) and purebred: over 70% of cases of FIP are in pedigree kittens.
 History: the cat experienced stress such as recent neutering or vaccination
 History: the cat had an opportunity to become infected with FCoV, such as originating in a breeding or rescue cattery, or the recent introduction of a purebred kitten or cat into the household.
 Clinical signs: the cat has become anorexic or is eating less than usual; has lost weight or failed to gain weight; has a fever of unknown origin; intra-ocular signs; jaundice.
 Biochemistry: hypergammaglobulinaemia; raised bilirubin without liver enzymes being raised.
 Hematology: lymphopenia; non-regenerative—usually mild—anaemia.
 Serology: the cat has a high antibody titre to FCoV: this parameter should be used with caution, because of the high prevalence of FCoV in breeding and rescue catteries.

Non-effusive FIP can be ruled out as a diagnosis if the cat is seronegative, provided the antibody test has excellent sensitivity.  In a study which compared various commercially available in-house FCoV antibody tests, the FCoV Immunocomb (Biogal) was 100% sensitive; the Speed F-Corona rapid immunochromatographic (RIM) test (Virbac) was 92.4% sensitive and the FASTest feline infectious peritonitis (MegaCor Diagnostik) RIM test was 84.6% sensitive.

Treatment

Because FIP is an immune-mediated disease, treatment falls into two categories: direct action against the virus itself and modulation of the immune response.

Antiviral drugs

Immunostimulants 
Immunostimulants are drugs that make the immune system more active against the virus. The most common drugs of this class for treating FIP are either recombinant feline interferon omega (Virbagen Omega, Virbac) or human
interferon alfa-2b. Since the human version ends up being targeted by the immune system for being a foreign antigen, the feline version feline interferon is more effective.

An experimental polyprenyl immunostimulant (PI) is manufactured by Sass and Sass and tested by Dr. Al Legendre, who described survival over 1 year in three cats diagnosed with FIP and treated with the medicine. In a subsequent field study of 60 cats with non-effusive FIP treated with PI, 52 cats (87%) died before 200 days, but eight cats survived over 200 days from the start of PI treatment for and four of those survived beyond 300 days.

Antivirals
Antivirals (in the narrow sense) act by interfering with the enzymes or other biological processes in the FIP virus.

An experimental drug called GS-441524 was used in a field experiment of 31 cats. After 25 days, five cats had died, eight had been cured and subsequently relapsed, and 18 had been cured without any subsequent relapses. The eight who relapsed were treated again, some with higher doses. Of these eight, one died and seven were cured, meaning that 25 of the 31 cats were ultimately cured of FIP. Although the drug is not yet (as of 2019) commercially available in the United States, this study is considered very promising and may lead to commercially available medication for the treatment of FIP. GS-441524 is available at >99% purity commercially from research chemical suppliers such as Selleckchem, MedKoo and MedChemExpress.

An experimental antiviral drug called GC376 was used in a field trial of 20 cats: 7 cats went into remission, and 13 cats responded initially but relapsed and were euthanized. This drug is not yet (as of 2017) commercially available.

Anti-inflammatory drugs
It is generally recommended to use an anti-inflammatory drug against FIP.

Immunosuppressive drugs dampen the immune system, helping to reduce inflammation. The go-to immunosuppressive drug in FIP is prednisolone, a corticosteroid. There are no placebo-controlled trials showing prednisolone to be better than other anti-inflammatories.

Prevention

Vaccination 
There is no effective vaccine against FIPV. DNA vaccination with plasmids encoding FIPV proteins failed to produce immunity. Rather, it was observed that antibodies to the FIPV spike protein exacerbate the disease.

Prevention 
Kittens are protected from infection by maternally derived antibody until weaning, usually around 5–7 weeks of age; therefore, it is possible to prevent infection of kittens by removing them from sources of infection. However, FCoV is a very contagious virus and such prevention does require rigorous hygiene.

In film
A 2018 film titled Aeris, by Paul Castro Jr. and Aly Miller, and starring Frank Deal, Arabella Oz and Betsy Aidem, is about a kitten born with FIP that is purchased from a pet store and the owners' twelve days with it. The film received an award at the 2018 Garden State Film Festival in the Narrative Short category and was a Gold Kahuna winner at the 2018 Honolulu Film Awards.

See also
 Feline vaccination
 Feline leukemia virus

References

External links
 Feline Infectious Peritonitis and Coronavirus Website
 Why Do Cats Purr? Is It Good Or Bad? - Two Cat Freaks Blog
 Feline Infectious Peritonitis from vetinfo.com
 Research on Feline Infectious Peritonitis from University of Tennessee, College of Veterinary Medicine
 FIP: A 2012 Update
 FIP Informational Brochure from the Cornell Feline Health Center
 UC Davis Center for Companion Animal Health
 Animal Health Channel 
 Feline Advisory Bureau
 FIP (Felipedia.org)

Cat diseases
Animal viral diseases
Coronavirus-associated diseases